The canton of Les Pyrénées catalanes is an administrative division of the Pyrénées-Orientales department, in southern France. It was created at the French canton reorganisation which came into effect in March 2015. Its seat is in Prades.

It consists of the following communes: 
 
Les Angles 
Angoustrine-Villeneuve-des-Escaldes
Ayguatébia-Talau
Bolquère
Bourg-Madame
La Cabanasse
Campôme
Canaveilles
Catllar
Caudiès-de-Conflent
Clara-Villerach
Codalet
Conat
Dorres
Égat
Enveitg
Err
Escaro
Estavar 
Eus
Eyne
Font-Romeu-Odeillo-Via
Fontpédrouse
Fontrabiouse
Formiguères
Jujols
Latour-de-Carol
La Llagonne
Llo
Los Masos
Matemale
Molitg-les-Bains
Mont-Louis
Mosset
Nahuja
Nohèdes
Nyer
Olette
Oreilla
Osséja
Palau-de-Cerdagne
Planès
Porta
Porté-Puymorens
Prades
Puyvalador
Railleu
Réal
Ria-Sirach
Saillagouse
Sainte-Léocadie
Saint-Pierre-dels-Forcats
Sansa
Sauto
Serdinya
Souanyas
Targasonne
Thuès-Entre-Valls
Ur
Urbanya
Valcebollère
Villefranche-de-Conflent

References

Cantons of Pyrénées-Orientales